Computacenter plc is a British multinational that provides computer services to public- and private-sector customers. It is a UK company based in Hatfield, Hertfordshire. The company is listed on the London Stock Exchange and is a constituent of the FTSE 250 Index.

History
Computacenter was founded in the UK in 1981 by Philip Hulme and Peter Ogden. In 1990, it opened Europe's largest PC outlet; in 1991, it was listed by The Independent newspaper as one of the fastest growing independent companies in the UK and, by 1994, it had grown to become the largest privately owned IT company in the UK. Computacenter was floated on the London Stock Exchange in 1998. In 2006 the company extended its service facilities to include a new International Service Centre in Barcelona, Spain, and a customer help desk and remote management facility in Cape Town, South Africa.

Operations
The company is engaged in the supply, implementation, support and management of information technology systems. Computacenter operates subsidiaries and brands that address specific market segments. The following companies were acquired by Computacenter and are now integrated within their business:
 Digica, which provides outsourcing and managed IT services to the corporate mid-market and the public sector.
 Allnet, which specialises in network integration and structured cabling services

Sponsorships
Computacenter was a sponsor of the Renault Sport F1 Team.

Social responsibility
Computacenter has committed itself to the 10 core principles of United Nations Global Compact. The company also works with its customers to help them meet their 'sustainable IT' objectives. In November 2007 Computacenter won BT’s inaugural Supplier Innovation Award for its work on virtualising and consolidating a number of their UK datacentres, helping BT reduce the carbon footprint. Computacenter says its cost-neutral service to Marks & Spencer has also helped M&S meet its WEEE requirements and its 'Plan A' environmental objectives, sending zero IT waste from M&S head office to landfill in 2008. The German branch of Computacenter is partner of the White IT, an alliance against Internet child pornography.

References

External links
 

Computer companies of the United Kingdom
Companies based in Welwyn Hatfield
Computer companies established in 1981
Companies listed on the London Stock Exchange